Edmund Getty MRIA (1799 in Belfast – 1857 in London) was an Irish antiquarian and naturalist.

Getty was educated at the Royal Belfast Academical Institution. He became Ballast Master of the Belfast Ballast Board and, later, Secretary of the Belfast Harbour Board. He was responsible for the reclamation of the slob-lands on the County Down and building of a "Crystal Palace" park. He wrote Chinese Seals in Ireland, The History of the Harbour Board, Last King of Ulster and articles on Tory Island and round towers. He was a founder member of the Belfast Natural History Society and one of the founders of Belfast Botanic Gardens.

References
Nash, R. and Ross, H.C.G. The development of natural history in early 19th century Ireland in From Linnaeus to Darwin: commentaries on the history of biology and geology Society for the bibliography of Natural History 13:27- 

Irish naturalists
1799 births
1857 deaths
Scientists from Belfast